André Previn Plays Songs by Jerome Kern is a solo jazz album by André Previn. It was intended as a homage to composer Jerome Kern. It was recorded in February and March 1959.

Track listing
 "Long Ago (And Far Away)" - 5:27
 "Sure Thing" - 3:22
 "A Fine Romance" - 2:38
 "They Didn't Believe Me" - 5:39
 "All the Things You Are" - 3:52
 "Whip-Poor-Will" - 4:27
 "Ol' Man River" - 6:01
 "Why Do I Love You" - 4:07
 "Go Little Boat" - 4:03
 "Put Me to the Test" - 3:31
Tracks 1-5 recorded on February 26, 1959; tracks 6-10 on March 10, 1959

Personnel
André Previn - piano
Howard Holzer - sound
Phil De Lancie - digital remastering (1991 re-release)

References

1959 albums
André Previn albums
Contemporary Records albums
Kern, Jerome
Solo piano jazz albums